Associazione Calcio Crema 1908 is an Italian association football club located in Crema, Lombardy. It currently plays in Serie D Group D. Its colors are black and white.

The club took part to two Serie B seasons immediately after the second World War, led by world champion Renato Olmi.

References

External links
Official website 

Football clubs in Lombardy
Association football clubs established in 1908
Serie D clubs
1908 establishments in Italy
Phoenix clubs (association football)